The North East Lanarkshire by-election was a Parliamentary by-election held on 26 September 1901. The constituency returned one Member of Parliament (MP) to the House of Commons of the United Kingdom, elected by the first past the post voting system.

Liberal Unionist party candidate Sir William Henry Rattigan won the seat from the Liberal Party who had held the seat at the general election the year before.

Results

References

North East Lanarkshire by-election
North East Lanarkshire by-election
1900s elections in Scotland
North East Lanarkshire by-election
By-elections to the Parliament of the United Kingdom in Scottish constituencies